Kuartango (Basque and official name. ) is a town and municipality  located in the province of Álava, in the Basque Country, northern Spain. The Spanish western film Algo más que morir was shot in Kuartango.

References

External links
 "Kuartango" in the Auñamendi Eusko Entziklopedia 
 The official website for Kuartango 

Municipalities in Álava